The Penrhyn Port Class was a class of three narrow gauge steam locomotives built for the Penrhyn Quarry Railway (PQR). These locomotives were built by the Hunslet Engine Company between 1883 and 1885 and supplied specifically to work at Port Penrhyn near Bangor, north Wales. They were a variant of the standard Dinorwic Alice Class design.

History 
The three locomotives of this class were ordered by the Penrhyn Quarry Railway to replace two vertical boilered De Winton locomotives. The first pair, Gwynedd and Lilian were delivered in 1883 and the final locomotive of the class, Winifred was delivered in 1885.

Winifred worked until July 1964, Gwynedd until August 1954, and Lilian until August 1956.

Preservation 

All three locomotives have survived: Gwynedd at the Bressingham Steam Museum, Lilian at the Launceston Steam Railway and Winifred spent many years in private ownership in the United States before returning to the UK in 2012 to work at the Bala Lake Railway.

References 

0-4-0 locomotives
Hunslet narrow gauge locomotives
Preserved narrow gauge steam locomotives of Great Britain
Railway locomotives introduced in 1883